A slipway, also known as boat ramp or launch or boat deployer, is a ramp on the shore by which ships or boats can be moved to and from the water. They are used for building and repairing ships and boats, and for launching and retrieving small boats on trailers towed by automobiles and flying boats on their undercarriage.

The nautical terms ways and skids are alternative names for slipway. A ship undergoing construction in a shipyard is said to be on the ways. If a ship is scrapped there, she is said to be broken up in the ways.

As the word "slip" implies, the ships or boats are moved over the ramp, by way of crane or fork lift. Prior to the move the vessel's hull is coated with grease, which then allows the ship or boat to "slip" off of the ramp and progress safely into the water. Slipways are used to launch (newly built) large ships, but can only dry-dock or repair smaller ships. 

Pulling large ships against the greased ramp would require too much force. Therefore, for dry-docking large ships, one must use carriages supported by wheels or by roller-pallets. These types of dry-docking installations are called "marine railways". Nevertheless the words "slip" and "slipway" are also used for all dry-docking installations that use a ramp.

Simple slipways  

In its simplest form, a slipway is a plain ramp, typically made of concrete, steel, stone or even wood. The height of the tide can limit the usability of a slip: unless the ramp continues well below the low water level it may not be usable at low tide. Normally there is a flat paved area on the landward end.

When used for building and repairing boats or small ships (i.e. ships of no more than about 300 tons), the vessel is moved on a wheeled carriage, which is run down the ramp until the vessel can float on or off the carriage. Such slipways are used for repair as well as for putting newly built vessels in the water.

When used for launching and retrieving small boats, the trailer is placed in the water. The boat may be either floated on and off the trailer or pulled off. When recovering the boat from the water, it is winched back up the trailer.

Whaling ships are usually equipped with a slipway at the back, to assist in hauling harpooned whales onto the main deck, where they are usually flensed.

To achieve a safe launch of some types of land-based lifeboats in bad weather and difficult sea conditions, the lifeboat and slipway are designed so that the lifeboat slides down a relatively steep steel slip under gravity.

Slipways in ship construction 

 
For large ships, slipways are only used in construction of the vessel. They may be arranged parallel or perpendicular to the shore line (or as nearly so as the water and maximum length of vessel allows). On launching, the vessel slides down the slipway on the ways until it floats by itself. The process of transferring the vessel to the water is known as launching and is normally a ceremonial and celebratory occasion. It is the point where the vessel is formally named. At this point the hull is complete and the propellers and associated shafting are in place, but dependent on the depth of water, stability and weight the engines might have not been fitted or the superstructure may not be completed.

In a perpendicular slipway, the ship is normally built with its stern facing the water. Modern slipways take the form of a reinforced concrete mat of sufficient strength to support the vessel, with two "barricades" that extend to well below the water level taking into account tidal variations. The barricades support the two launch ways. The vessel is built upon temporary cribbing that is arranged to give access to the hull's outer bottom, and to allow the launchways to be erected under the complete hull.  When it is time to prepare for launching a pair of standing ways are erected under the hull and out onto the barricades. The surface of these ways are greased (Tallow and whale oil were used as grease in sailing ship days). A pair of sliding ways is placed on top, under the hull, and a launch cradle with bow and stern poppets is erected on these sliding ways. The weight of the hull is then transferred from the build cribbing onto the launch cradle. Provision is made to hold the vessel in place and then release it at the appropriate moment in the launching ceremony, these are either a weak link designed to be cut at a signal or a mechanical trigger controlled by a switch from the ceremonial platform.

Some slipways are built so that the vessel is side on to the water and is launched sideways. This is done where the limitations of the water channel would not allow lengthwise launching, but occupies a much greater length of shore. The Great Eastern built by Brunel was built this way as were many landing craft during World War II. This method requires many more sets of ways to support the weight of the ship.

In both cases heavy chains are attached to the ship and the drag effect is used to slow the vessel once afloat until tugboats can move the hull to a jetty for fitting out.

The practice of building on a slipway is dying out with the increasing size of vessels from about the 1970s. Part of the reason is the space requirement for slowing and maneuvering the vessel immediately after it has left the slipway, but the sheer size of the vessel causes design problems, since the hull is basically supported only at its end points during the launch process and this imposes stresses not met during normal operation.

See also 
Boat lift
Canoe launch
Dry dock
Ferry slip
Harbor
Patent slip (marine railway)
Port
Ship cradle
Shiplift
Travel lift

References

Shipbuilding
Coastal construction